Stand Up is the third Korean extended play by South Korean boy group Big Bang, it was released on August 8, 2008. The EP sold over 140,000 copies by the end of the following month, supported by the popularity of the number one hit single "Haru Haru". The song became one of the most downloaded singles of all-time in South Korea.

Background 
Teasers for the album was released on August 1, including the announcement that Japanese DJ Daishi Dance had collaborated with the group on a song. Released on August 8, 2008, the EP sold more than 30,000 copies in two days and sold 100,000 copies in two weeks. Stand Up was the number-one album of the month for August 2008, becoming the group's first monthly number-one album in South Korea. It eventually sold over 168,000 copies by 2016.

Track listing

Personnel
Credits for Stand Up adapted are from album liner notes.

 Choi Seung-hyun "T.O.P" – co-producer and recording producer
 Tom Coyne – mastering
 Hong Jang-hyun – photographer
 Ji Eun – make-up and stylist
 Jang Sung-eun – artwork and design
 Kim Byunghoon "Kush" – co-producer and recording producer
 Kim Chang-kyum – recording engineer
 Kim Tae-hyun – hair stylist
 Kwon Ji-yong "G-Dragon" – producer and recording producer
 Lee Byung-young – artist manager
 Lee Gyeong-jun – recording engineer
 Lee Kang-hyun – art director
 Oh Young-taek – recording engineer
 Park Hong-jun "Teddy" – co-producer and recording producer
 Jason Robert – mixing engineer
 Today Art – printing 
 Yang Eun-jin – artwork and design
 Yang Hyun Suk – executive producer, mixing engineer and producer
 Yang Min-Suk – executive supervisor

Charts

Weekly charts

Monthly charts

References

External links
 Big Bang Official site

BigBang (South Korean band) EPs
2008 EPs
YG Entertainment EPs
Korean-language EPs
Albums produced by G-Dragon

it:Stand Up#Musica